Juan Samorano (born 25 September 1981) is a Argentine para taekwondo practitioner. He won one of the bronze medals in the men's 75 kg event at the 2020 Summer Paralympics in Tokyo, Japan.

In 2019, he won one of the bronze medals in the men's 75 kg event at the Parapan American Games held in Lima, Peru.

References

Living people
1981 births
Place of birth missing (living people)
Argentine male taekwondo practitioners
Medalists at the 2019 Parapan American Games
Taekwondo practitioners at the 2020 Summer Paralympics
Medalists at the 2020 Summer Paralympics
Paralympic bronze medalists for Argentina
Paralympic medalists in taekwondo
21st-century Argentine people